The 1980 United States Senate election in Connecticut took place on November 4, 1980, alongside other elections to the United States Senate and United States House of Representatives. Incumbent Democratic U.S. Senator Abraham Ribicoff decided to retire. Democrat Chris Dodd won the open seat.

Republican primary

Candidates 
 Richard Bozzuto, State Senator
 James Buckley, former U.S. Senator from New York

Results

General election

Results

See also 
 1980 United States Senate elections

References 

1980 Connecticut elections
1980
Connecticut
Chris Dodd